Stephen M. Shepherd (November 1, 1875 – August 20, 1910) was an American lawyer and politician who was elected to one term in the Virginia House of Delegates before dying of a stroke at age 34.

References

External links 

1875 births
1910 deaths
Democratic Party members of the Virginia House of Delegates
20th-century American politicians